Bermo Assembly constituency   is an assembly constituency in  the Indian state of Jharkhand. The current MLA is Indian National Congress's Kumar Jaimangal Singh alias Anup Singh. Anup Singh is the son of former MLA Late Rajender Singh of Bermo Constituency.

Members of Assembly 

1957: Brajeshwar Prasad Singh, CNPSPJP
1962: Bindeshwari Dubey, Indian National Congress
1967: Bindeshwari Dubey, Indian National Congress 
1969: Bindeshwari Dubey, Indian National Congress 
1972: Bindeshwari Dubey, Indian National Congress
1977: Mithilesh Kumar Sinha, Janata Party
1980: Ramdas Singh, Bharatiya Janata Party
1985: Rajendra Prasad Singh, Indian National Congress
1990: Rajendra Prasad Singh, Indian National Congress
1995: Rajendra Prasad Singh, Indian National Congress
2000: Rajendra Prasad Singh, Indian National Congress
2005: Yogeshwar Mahto, Bharatiya Janata Party
2009: Rajendra Prasad Singh, Indian National Congress
2014: Yogeshwar Mahto, Bharatiya Janata Party
2019: Rajendra Prasad Singh, Indian National Congress
 2020 (By-election): Kumar Jaimangal Singh, Indian National Congress

Election results

2020 by-election

2019

See also
Vidhan Sabha
List of states of India by type of legislature

References

Assembly constituencies of Jharkhand